Ayele (Amharic: አየለ) is a male name of Ethiopian origin that may refer to:

Ayele Abshero (born 1990), Ethiopian long-distance runner and world junior cross country champion
Ayele Mezgebu (born 1973), Ethiopian long-distance runner
Alemayo Kebede Ayele (born 1987), Eritrean footballer
Seteng Ayele (born 1955), Ethiopian-Israeli marathon runner

See also
Haile, a variant of the name

Amharic-language names